Lara Wolf  (born 23 March 2000) is an Austrian freestyle skier who competes internationally. She competed in the World Championships 2017, and participated at the 2018 Winter Olympics in the women's slopestyle event. She outed herself as lesbian.

References

External links

2000 births
Living people
Austrian female freestyle skiers 
Olympic freestyle skiers of Austria 
Freestyle skiers at the 2018 Winter Olympics 
Freestyle skiers at the 2022 Winter Olympics
Freestyle skiers at the 2016 Winter Youth Olympics
Austrian LGBT sportspeople
Lesbian sportswomen
LGBT skiers
21st-century LGBT people